is a Japanese Nippon Professional Baseball pitcher with the Chiba Lotte Marines in Japan's Pacific League.

External links

NPB

Living people
1989 births
People from Narita, Chiba
Baseball people from Chiba Prefecture
Japanese baseball players
Chiba Lotte Marines players
Baseball pitchers